Mauro Alexandre Da Silva Vilhete (born 10 May 1993) is a Portuguese footballer who plays as a utility player for Dagenham & Redbridge.

Career

Club
Born in Rio de Mouro, Sintra, Portugal, Vilhete moved to Barnet, England at a young age. He attended The Ravenscroft School, where he was tasked with analysing data from Barnet F.C. matches. He joined Barnet's youth team in 2009 after turning down an offer of a scholarship from Aston Villa. Following a series of injuries to first-team regulars, manager Ian Hendon called him into the first-team squad in November 2009, however he only appeared on the bench during this time. In April 2010, he signed a two-year professional contract with the Bees. He made his debut on 1 May 2010 in a 2–0 away defeat to Grimsby Town aged 16, becoming Barnet's youngest ever Football League player, breaking the record of 17 years and 46 days set by Kofi Lockhart-Adams against Cheltenham Town on 24 November 2009, before losing the record to Mathew Stevens on 6 September 2014. Vilhete scored his first goal for Barnet in October 2010 against Southend United in the Football League Trophy. Vilhete joined Hendon on a one-month loan on 4 November 2011, where he made six appearances. He then joined Boreham Wood on another one-month loan on 17 February 2012.

On 31 August 2012, Vilhete joined Boreham Wood on loan again until January 2013.

On 25 April 2015, Vilhete scored both goals in a 2–0 win over Gateshead to secure the Conference title for Barnet and promotion back to League Two. He was also awarded the Conference Player of the Month award for April.

Vilhete was loaned to Boreham Wood for a third time on 30 October 2015. He scored a day later, in a 2–3 home defeat against Gateshead.

Martin Allen made Vilhete available on a free transfer at the end of the 2015-16 season, but no move materialised and he worked his way back into first-team contention.

In the 2019-20 season, he made his 200th appearance for the Bees and scored in the National League playoffs against Yeovil Town. He left the club at the end of the season, having scored 22 goals in 227 games across eleven seasons.

On 19 September 2020, Vilhete joined Isthmian League side Wingate & Finchley. In January 2021, he joined Hampton & Richmond Borough on loan.

On 12 March 2021, Vilhete signed for National League side Dagenham & Redbridge.

International
In November 2010, Vilhete said he wanted to play international football for either England or Portugal, but said "it would probably be Portugal in the end". In March 2011, he was called up for a training camp with the Portugal national under-18 football team.

Style of play
Vilhete has played on both the left and right sides as a full-back and winger, and has also played central midfield for Barnet. He has been described as a utility player.

Career statistics

Honours
Barnet
Conference Premier
Champions: 2014–15

References

External links

Mauro Vilhete profile at the Barnet website

Living people
1993 births
Portuguese footballers
English footballers
Portuguese sportspeople of Angolan descent
English people of Angolan descent
Association football defenders
Association football midfielders
Barnet F.C. players
Hendon F.C. players
Boreham Wood F.C. players
Dagenham & Redbridge F.C. players
Wingate & Finchley F.C. players
Hampton & Richmond Borough F.C. players
English Football League players
National League (English football) players
Isthmian League players
People from Sintra
Sportspeople from Lisbon District